(also known as ) is the conventional title given to a section of the Poetic Edda text in .

Its content consists mostly of verses concerned with runic magic and general wisdom literature, presented as advice given by Sigrdrífa to Sigurd.

The end is in the lost part of the manuscript but it has been substituted from younger paper manuscripts. The  describes the scene and contains some of the poem.

Name
The compound  means "driver to victory" (or "victory-urger", "inciter to victory") 
Bellows (1936) emphasizes that  is an epithet of Brynhildr (and not a "second Valkyrie").

Contents
The  follows the  without break, and editors are not unanimous in where they set the title.
Its state of preservation is the most chaotic in the Eddaic collection. 
The text is cut off after the first line of stanza 29, but this stanza has been completed, and eight others have been added, on the evidence of the much later testimony of paper manuscripts.

The poem appears to be a compilation of originally unrelated poems.

The basis of the text appears to be a poem dealing with Sigurd's finding of Brynhild, but only five stanzas (2-4, 20-21) deal with this narrative directly. 
Stanza 1 is probably taken from another poem about Sigurd and Brynhild.

In stanzas 6-12, Brynhild teaches Sigurd the magic use of the runes. To this has been added similar passages on rune-lore from unrelated sources,  stanzas 5 and 13-19.
This passage is the most prolific source about historical runic magic which has been preserved.

This passage is probably an accretion unrelated to the Brynhild fragment, and it contains in turn a number of what are likely interpolations to the original text.

The valkyrie's drinking-speech 
The first three stanzas are spoken by Sigrdrífa after she has been awoken by Sigurd (stanza 1 in Bellows 1936 corresponds to the final stanza 45 of Fáfnismál in the edition of Jonsson 1905).

The following two stanzas are introduced as follows:
 
 "Sigurth sat beside her and asked her name. She took a horn full of mead and gave him a memory-draught."

Henry Adams Bellows stated in his commentary that stanzas 2-4 are "as fine as anything in Old Norse poetry" and these three stanzas constituted the basis of much of the third act in Richard Wagner's opera Siegfried.
This fragment is the only direct invocation of the Norse gods which has been preserved, and it is sometimes dubbed a "pagan prayer".

The first two stanzas are given below in close transcription (Bugge 1867), in normalized Old Norse (Jonsson 1905) and in the translations by Thorpe (1866) and of  Bellows (1936):

Runic stanzas
Stanzas 5-18 concern runic magic, explaining the use of runes in various contexts.

In stanza 5, Sigrdrífa brings Sigurd ale which she has charmed with runes:

Stanza 6 advises to carve "victory runes" on the sword hilt, presumably referring to the t rune named for Tyr:

The following stanzas address  "Ale-runes" (7),
 "birth-runes" (8),
 "wave-runes" (9),
 "branch-runes" (10),
 "speech-runes" (11),
 "thought-runes" (12).
Stanzas 13-14 appear to have been taken from a poem about the finding of the runes by Odin.
Stanzas 15-17 are again from an unrelated poem, but still about the topic of runes. 
The same holds for stanzas 18-19, which return to the mythological acquisition of the runes, and the passing of their knowledge to the æsir, elves, vanir and mortal men.

Gnomic stanzas
Stanzas 20-21 are again in the setting of the frame narrative, with Brynhild asking Sigurd to make a choice. 
They serve as introduction for the remaining part of the text, stanzas 22-37 (of which, however, only 22-28 and the first line of 29 are preserved in ), which are gnomic in nature.
Like , the text consists of numbered counsels, running from one to eleven.
The "unnumbered" stanzas 25, 27, 30, 34 and 36 are considered interpolations by Bellows (1936).

Editions and translations

  Benjamin Thorpe (trans.), The Edda Of Sæmund The Learned, 1866 online copy, at northvegr.org
 Sophus Bugge, Sæmundar Edda, 1867 (edition of the manuscript text) online copy 
  Henry Adams Bellows (1936) (translation and commentary)   online copy, at sacred-texts.com
  Guðni Jónsson, Eddukvæði: Sæmundar-Edda, 1949 (edition with normalized spelling)online copy
  W. H. Auden and P. B. Taylor (trans.), The Elder Edda: A Selection, 1969

References

Jansson, Sven B. F. (Foote, Peter; transl.)(1987). Runes in Sweden. 
Steinsland, G. & Meulengracht Sørensen, P. (1998): Människor och makter i vikingarnas värld. 
Einar G. Pétursson, Hvenær týndist kverið úr Konungsbók Eddukvæða? , Gripla 6 (1984), 265-291 
Einar G. Pétursson, Eddurit Jóns Guðmundssonar lærða: Samantektir um skilning á Eddu og Að fornu í þeirri gömlu norrænu kölluðust rúnir bæði ristingar og skrifelsi: Þættir úr fræðasögu 17. aldar, Stofnun Árna Magnússonar á Íslandi, Rit 46 (1998),  vol I, pp. 402–40: introduction to Jón's commentary on the poem Brynhildarljóð (Sígrdrífumál) in Völsunga saga; vol. II, 95-102: the text of the commentary.

Völsung cycle
Eddic poetry
Sources of Norse mythology
Nibelung tradition
Old Norse philosophy
Valkyries
Brunhild